ELA-3, is a launch pad and associated facilities at the Centre Spatial Guyanais in French Guiana. ELA-3 is operated by Arianespace as part of the expendable launch system for Ariane 5 launch vehicles. , 114 launches have been carried out from it, the first of which occurred on 4 June 1996.

ELA-3 is 21 square kilometres in size.

Launch history

Scheduled flights

References 

Guiana Space Centre